Langona manicata is a jumping spider species in the genus Langona. The female was first described by Eugène Simon in 1901.

Distribution
Langona manicata  is native to South Africa.

References

Endemic fauna of South Africa
Salticidae
Spiders of South Africa
Spiders described in 1901